Supernova is a Latvian music entertainment show created by the Latvian broadcaster, LTV. It is currently used as the Latvian national selection for the Eurovision Song Contest.

Supernova began airing in 2015, replacing the previous short-lived Latvian national selection Dziesma. Its first winner, Aminata Savadogo went on to bring Latvia to the Eurovision Song Contest final for the first time since 2008, earning Latvia their best placing since 2005, and their fourth best placing ever.

Winners

Seasons

Supernova 2015

Supernova 2015 consisted of two introduction shows, two heats, a semi-final, and a final. The introduction shows took place on 18 and 25 January 2015, the heats on 1 and 8 February 2015, the semi-final on 15 February 2015, and the final on 22 February 2015. The season started out with twenty competitors; however, only four made it to the final, where Aminata and her song "Love Injected" was declared the winner. A mix of jury voting and voting from the public decided the qualifiers of the heats and semi-finals; however, only voting from the public decided the winner of the final.

Supernova 2016

Supernova 2016 consisted of two introduction shows, two heats, a semi-final, and a final. The introduction shows took place on 24 and 31 January 2016, the heats on 7 and 14 February 2016, the semi-final on 21 February 2016, and the final on 28 February 2016. The competing artists and their songs were revealed during the second introduction show. The season started out with twenty competitors; however, only four made it to the final, where Justs and his song "Heartbeat" was declared the winner. A mix of jury voting and voting from the public decided the qualifiers of the heats and semi-finals; however, only voting from the public decided the winner of the final.

Supernova 2017

Supernova 2017 consisted of two introduction shows, two heats, a semi-final, and a final. The introduction shows took place on 22 and 29 January 2017, the heats on 5 and 12 February 2017, the semi-final on 19 February 2017, and the final on 26 February 2017. The competing artists and their songs were revealed on 13 January 2017. The season started out with twenty-two competitors; however, only four made it to the final, where Triana Park and their song "Line" were declared the winners. A mix of jury voting and voting from the public decided the qualifiers of the heats and semi-finals; however, only voting from the public decided the winner of the final.

Supernova 2018

Supernova 2018 consisted of two introductory shows and four competition shows. Twenty-one artists competed in this season, which consisted of three semifinals and a final; the top two artists from each semifinal and the next-highest ranked artist from all three semifinals advanced to the final (for a total of seven artists). The first semifinal took place on 3 February, and the second and third semifinals took place on 10 February and 17 February, respectively. Technical voting errors were encountered during the second semifinal; this increased the number of artists in the final to eight. In the final, which was held on 24 February, Laura Rizzotto was declared the winner of the competition after her song "Funny Girl" scored the highest number of votes from the public.

Supernova 2019

Supernova 2019 consisted of three shows. Sixteen artists competed this season, which consisted of two semi-finals and a final; the top four artists from each semi-final advanced to the final (for a total of eight artists). The first semi-final took place on 26 January, while the second semi-final took place on 2 February. In the final, which was held on 16 February, Carousel and their song "That Night" were declared the winners following a mix of jury voting and votes from the Latvian public.

Supernova 2020

Supernova 2020 consisted of a qualification round and a final. This was the first year, that semi-finals did not happen. 28 artists competed in the qualification round. 9 songs reached a final. In the final, which was held on 8 February, Samanta Tīna with her song "Still Breathing" was declared as the winning song, following a mix of jury and televote.

Following the cancellation of the Eurovision Song Contest 2020 due to the COVID-19 pandemic, Samanta Tīna was internally re-selected to represent Latvia in the Eurovision Song Contest 2021, with a new song, "The Moon Is Rising".

Supernova 2022

Supernova 2023

References

External links

2015 Latvian television series debuts
Eurovision Song Contest selection events
Music competitions in Latvia
Recurring events established in 2015
Singing talent shows
Latvian music television series
Latvian reality television series
2010s Latvian television series
2015 establishments in Latvia
Winter events in Latvia